Sarah Harrison is a former WikiLeaks section editor. She worked with the WikiLeaks' legal defence and has been described as Julian Assange's closest adviser. Harrison accompanied National Security Agency whistleblower Edward Snowden on a high-profile flight from Hong Kong to Moscow while he was sought by the United States government.

WikiLeaks 

As an intern at the UK-based Centre for Investigative Journalism, she was assigned to Julian Assange before the Afghan War documents leak. After Daniel Domscheit-Berg left WikiLeaks over a dispute with Assange, Harrison's role in the organisation increased, particularly with the US diplomatic cables leak and Assange's legal fight against Swedish extradition. She worked with the WikiLeaks' legal defence led by Baltasar Garzón, and was Julian Assange's girlfriend, closest adviser and gatekeeper. In 2014, Harrison spoke about her support for WikiLeaks, saying "the greatest unaccountable power of today [is] the United States and our Western democracies." Harrison is a former WikiLeaks section editor.

Harrison also served as acting director of Courage Foundation, a UK trust to support whistleblowers originally cofounded by Julian Assange as the Journalistic Source Protection Defence Fund, from 2014 until April 2017, when WikiLeaks became a Courage beneficiary.

Edward Snowden 

On 24 June 2013, WikiLeaks said that Harrison accompanied National Security Agency leaker Edward Snowden on a high-profile flight from Hong Kong to Moscow en route to political asylum from US extradition. Dominic Rushe of The Guardian observed that Harrison was a "strange choice" because of her lack of legal qualifications compared to other WikiLeaks staff, such as human rights lawyer Jennifer Robinson. At the time, Harrison had been with the organisation for over two years.  On 1 August 2013, she accompanied Snowden out of Moscow's Sheremetyevo International Airport after he was granted a year of temporary asylum.

Exile from UK 
In 2014, Harrison said she was living in exile in Berlin as she had received legal advice that she would very likely be detained under the UK's Terrorism Act on entry to the UK. Under the Act she could be asked to provide information about WikiLeaks’ and Snowden's sources and refusal to answer would be a crime.

Award
Harrison received the Willy Brandt Peace Prize in 2015.

References

External links 

 WikiLeaks profile

1980s births
British journalists
WikiLeaks
Living people
Alumni of City, University of London
Alumni of Queen Mary University of London
People educated at Sevenoaks School
Julian Assange